Sebastinae is a subfamily of marine fish belonging to the family Scorpaenidae in the order Scorpaeniformes.  Their common names include rockfishes, rock perches, ocean perches, sea perches, thornyheads, scorpionfishes, sea ruffes and rockcods. Despite the latter name, they are not closely related to the cods in the genus Gadus, nor the rock cod, Lotella rhacina.

Taxonomy
Sebastinae, or Sebastidae, was first formally recognised as a grouping in 1873 by the German naturalist Johann Jakob Kaup. Some authorities recognise this family as distinct from Scorpaenidae. FishBase, a finfish database generated by a consortium of academic institutions, does, but the United States Federal government's Integrated Taxonomic Information System and the 5th Edition of Fishes of the World do not, FotW classify it as a subfamily of the Scorpaenidae.

Tribes and genera
Sebastinae is divided into two tribes and seven genera:

 Tribe Sebastini Kaup, 1873
 Helicolenus Goode & Bean, 1896
 Hozukius Matsubara, 1934
 Sebastes Cuvier, 1829
 Sebastiscus Jordan & Starks, 1904
 Tribe Sebastolobini Matsubara, 1943
 Adelosebastes Eschmeyer,  T. Abe & Nakano, 1979
 Sebastolobus Gill, 1881
 Trachyscorpia Ginsburg, 1953

Characteristics
Sebastinae species have a compressed body with the head typically having ridges and spines. The gill membranes are not attached to the isthmus. There is a venom gland in the spines of the dorsal, anal and pelvic fins.

Distribution and habitat
Sebastinae rockfishes are found in the Pacific, Indian and Atlantic Oceans with most species in the largest genus, the ovoviviparous Sebastes with over 100 species, in the North Pacific. They can be found in marine and brackish waters.

References

 
Scorpaenidae
Venomous fish
Ovoviviparous fish
Marine fish families
Taxa named by Johann Jakob Kaup